The 2007 Women's French Pacific Handball Championship was held in Auckland, New Zealand from 25–26 May 2005, as part of the Women's Pacific Handball Cup.

The competition participants Tahiti, and New Caledonia. Wallis and Futuna did not send a team.

The winners were New Caledonia over Tahiti.

Rankings

References

External links
 Archive on Tudor 66
 Oceania archive on Les Sport Info (French)
 Campeões Estaduais de Handebol (Spanish)

Pacific Handball Cup
French Pacific Women's Handball Cup
Women's handball competitions
International handball competitions hosted by New Zealand
Hand